Furu Purachina (降るプラチナ, lit. Falling Platinum) is Akino Arai's fourth official album release.

Track listing
"スプートニク"
(SUPUUTONIKU, Sputnik)
"願い事"
(Negaigoto, The Wish)
"ガレキの楽園"
(Gareki no Rakuen, Paradise of Rubble)
"Flower"
"Orange Noel"
"愛の温度"
(Ai no Ondo, Temperature of Love)
"Réve"
(Dream)
"音叉"
(Onsa, Tuning Fork)
"赤い砂白い花"
(Akai Suna Shiroi Hana, Red Sand White Flower)
"降るプラチナ"
(Furu Purachina, Falling Platinum)
"メロディ"
(Merodi, Melody)

External links
 www.akinoarai.com
 
 Sputnik review by Houston Press

2000 albums
Akino Arai albums
Victor Entertainment albums